The Illustrated Australian News was a monthly news magazine of record in Melbourne, Victoria, Australia. Its precursor Illustrated Australian News for Home Readers was first published in 1837 by Ebenezer Syme and David Syme. The title was later changed to The Illustrated Australian News and Musical Times and finally shortened to The Illustrated Australian News from no. 233 (26 January 1876) through to the final edition, no. 408 (1 May 1889).

References

1837 establishments in Australia
1889 disestablishments in Australia
Monthly magazines published in Australia
News magazines published in Australia
Defunct magazines published in Australia
Magazines established in 1837
Magazines disestablished in 1889
Magazines published in Melbourne